Arches and Aisles is an album by The Spinanes, released on September 23, 1998. The album features guest spots and co-production by John McEntire and vocals by Sam Prekop. This is the only Spinanes album to not feature founding member and drummer Scott Plouf, who left the duo in 1997 to join Built to Spill.

Composition
Musically, Arches is considered "richly textured" chamber-rock and indie rock.

Critical reception and legacy
AllMusic's Michael Gallucci dubbed Arches the group's "least confining, and most listenable" record, noting their "more melodic and lyrically enticing" direction. Spin applauded it, calling it "warm, thoughtful, and melodically gorgeous".

Looking back at the Spinanes' discography, Trouser Press singled it out as "a superlative album of quietly remarkable songs". They acknowledged singer Rebecca Gates' "surefooted songwriting and achingly intimate alto vocals". In 2008, near Sub Pop's 20th anniversary, Treble included it as one of the label's 20 essential releases. Staff writer Jeff Terich dubbed it "a bigger sounding, more sparkling affair" than its predecessors, as well as the Spinanes project's best work. In 2016, it placed #46 on Pitchforks list of Pacific Northwest indie rock's 50 best albums.

Track listing
 "Kid in Candy" – 4:33
 "Greetings from the Sugar Lick" – 4:18
 "72-74" – 3:06
 "Leisure Run" – 4:58
 "Love, the Lazee" – 4:27
 "Sucker's Trial" – 2:49
 "Slide Your Ass" – 1:50
 "Reach V. Speed" – 3:51
 "Den Trawler" – 4:05
 "Eleganza" – 4:15
 "Heisman Stance" – 4:19

Personnel
Credits adapted from Arches and Aisles liner notes.

The Spinanes
 Rebecca Gates - vocals, guitar, bass, piano, keyboards, Mellotron, organ 
with:
 Joanna Bolme - bass, guitar, Moog synthesizer, organ 
 Jerry Busher - drums, percussion

References

1998 albums
The Spinanes albums
Sub Pop albums

External links